Enis Bardhi (born 2 July 1995) is a Macedonian professional footballer who plays as an attacking midfielder for Turkish club Trabzonspor and the North Macedonia national team.

Club career

Early career
Born in Skopje to Albanian parents, Bardhi started his early career at KF Skupi. He later joined the Brøndby IF's youth system in 2013. In November of that year, however, he agreed to a one-year professional deal with Swedish Football Division 2 club KSF Prespa Birlik. He featured in ten matches and scored five goals for the club during his spell, helping in their narrow escape from relegation.

Újpest
In August 2014, Bardhi moved to Hungarian Nemzeti Bajnokság I club Újpest on trial, and signed a three-year contract late in the month.

Levante
On 17 July 2017, Bardhi agreed to a three-year deal with La Liga side Levante UD for an estimated €1.5 million. He made his La Liga debut on August 21, starting in a 1–0 home win against Villarreal CF.

On 26 August, he scored his debut goal in the top tier, a direct free kick in a 2–2 home draw against Deportivo de La Coruña.

Trabzonspor
On 12 August 2022, Bardhi moved to Turkish Süper Lig club Trabzonspor.

International career
Bardhi was born in Macedonia to a Kosovar Albanian family and was thus eligible to represent Macedonia, Albania or Kosovo. Bardhi desired to represent Albania, stating "I do not believe there is an Albanian born in Skopje, with Albanian families, who would not want to play for Albania". Redi Jupi, who was appointed as scouting manager for the Albanian Football Association, never approached Bardhi or responded to Bardhi's agents. With Football Federation of Macedonia showing genuine interest and Bardhi viewing the Albanian Football Association's handling of the situation and response as unprofessional, he accepted the call-up for Macedonia.

However, Jetmir Salihu, a representative for the Albanian Football Association, dismissed Bardhi's claim, unveiling all the text messages between him and the player, showing that Bardhi was never interested in playing for Albania in the first place. He also accused the player of trying to damage the image of the association with the aim to be seen as a hero to Albanian people, stating: "Since 2010 I've had hundreds of such cases, footballers that have refused the national team and at the end they came out with such statements because they want to make FSHF guilty so they can win the sympathy of Albanians."

Bardhi represented North Macedonia at under-17, under-19 and under-21 levels before making his senior international debut on 27 March 2015, coming on as a first-half substitute for Artim Položani in a 2–1 UEFA Euro 2016 qualifying home loss against Belarus.

Bardhi was part of North Macedonia's UEFA Euro 2020 squad, starting in all three of their group stage games.

Career statistics

Club

International

Scores and results list North Macedonia's goal tally first, score column indicates score after each Bardhi goal.

Honours
Újpest
Szuperkupa: 2014
Magyar Kupa runner-up: 2015–16

Individual
Macedonian Footballer of the Year: 2017

References

External links
Profile at Macedonian Football 
 HLSZ 
 
 
 

1995 births
Living people
Footballers from Skopje
Macedonian footballers
Association football wingers
KSF Prespa Birlik players
Újpest FC players
Levante UD footballers
Trabzonspor footballers
Nemzeti Bajnokság I players
La Liga players
Süper Lig players
North Macedonia youth international footballers
North Macedonia under-21 international footballers
North Macedonia international footballers
UEFA Euro 2020 players
Macedonian expatriate footballers
Expatriate men's footballers in Denmark
Expatriate footballers in Sweden
Expatriate footballers in Hungary
Expatriate footballers in Spain
Expatriate footballers in Turkey
Macedonian expatriate sportspeople in Denmark
Macedonian expatriate sportspeople in Sweden
Macedonian expatriate sportspeople in Hungary
Macedonian expatriate sportspeople in Spain
Macedonian expatriate sportspeople in Turkey
Albanian footballers from North Macedonia